Tołwin  is a village in the administrative district of Gmina Siemiatycze, within Siemiatycze County, Podlaskie Voivodeship, in north-eastern Poland.

According to the 1921 census, the village was inhabited by 360 people, among whom 330 were Roman Catholic, 8 Orthodox, and 22 Mosaic. At the same time, 331 inhabitants declared Polish nationality, 7 Belarusian and 22 Jewish. There were 55 residential buildings in the village.

References

Villages in Siemiatycze County